The men's 800 metres at the 2016 IAAF World Indoor Championships took place on March 18 and 19, 2016.

In the final, Boris Berian went out fast 23.92 for the first lap and 49.73, on the indoor level that is equivalent with taking the race into the Gray zone.  The rest of the field chose not to go with him, giving up seven meters by the half way point, expecting to pick up the pieces when Berian slowed.  At the end of the third lap, he had maintained the gap but looked tired.  Through the next 100 metres Antoine Gakeme and Musaeb Abdulrahman Balla closed down the gap to three metres.  Balla stumbled and lost ground.  Through the final turn Gakeme couldn't gain any further and on the final straightaway Berian pulled away for a clear 5 metre victory.  As Balla regained his form, Erik Sowinski pulled onto his shoulder and executed a perfect pass to take the bronze.

Results

Heats
Qualification: The winner of each heat (Q) and next 3 fastest (q) qualified for the final.

Final
The race was started on March 19 at 18:35.

References

800 metres
800 metres at the World Athletics Indoor Championships